João Alexandre Duarte Ferreira Fernandes (born 31 December 1979), known as Neca, is a Portuguese former footballer who played as a midfielder.

He amassed Primeira Liga totals of 225 matches and 29 goals over the course of 12 seasons, representing in the competition Belenenses, Vitória de Guimarães, Marítimo and Vitória de Setúbal. He also played professionally in Turkey.

Club career
Born in Lisbon, Neca started playing professionally for local C.F. Os Belenenses, being a starter from an early age. In the 2005–06 season he moved to fellow Primeira Liga club Vitória S.C. and, although he was an important first-team member, the Guimarães-based side were relegated.

In the summer of 2006, Neca signed for C.S. Marítimo on a Bosman transfer. After limited playing time, he was loaned out to Konyaspor in January 2007. He was definitely released by the Madeirans in December but stayed in Turkey, switching to Ankaraspor.

In late December 2009, Neca agreed on a return to his country, signing with struggling Vitória F.C. until the end of the campaign and contributing with 11 games and two goals as the Sadinos eventually escaped relegation. In the summer of 2012, at nearly 33, he returned to Konyaspor, with the club now in the second division.

International career
Neca represented Portugal at both the 1999 FIFA World Youth Championship and the 2002 UEFA European Under-21 Championship. In 2002, courtesy of his consistent performances at Belenenses, he earned two full caps.

References

External links

1979 births
Living people
Footballers from Lisbon
Portuguese footballers
Association football midfielders
Primeira Liga players
Liga Portugal 2 players
Segunda Divisão players
C.F. Os Belenenses players
Vitória S.C. players
C.S. Marítimo players
Vitória F.C. players
S.C. Farense players
C.D. Pinhalnovense players
Süper Lig players
TFF First League players
Konyaspor footballers
Ankaraspor footballers
Portugal youth international footballers
Portugal under-21 international footballers
Portugal international footballers
Portuguese expatriate footballers
Expatriate footballers in Turkey
Portuguese expatriate sportspeople in Turkey